Velika Begovica (1876–78) was a female rebel in the Kozjak region, which was under Ottoman rule (today part of North Macedonia), active during the Serbo-Turkish War (1876–78). She was born in Ramno (Staro Nagoričane) or Malotino (Kumanovo).

See also
Kumanovo Uprising
Čakr-paša

References

Sources
 

Serb rebels
Rebels from the Ottoman Empire
19th-century Serbian people
19th-century Serbian women
People from Kumanovo Municipality
Women in 19th-century warfare
Women in European warfare
People from Staro Nagoričane Municipality
Hajduks